Rahmanabad (also Romanized as Raḩmanābād; also known as Raḩmānābād and Raḩmānābād-e Anūj) is a village in Sefidkuh Rural District, Samen District, Malayer County, Hamadan Province, Iran. At the 2016 census, its population was 385, in 121 families.

Location 

The distance from Rahmanabad to the city of Malayer is 39 km.  Rahmanabad is located near the border of Hamadan province with Lorestan province and is adjacent to the villages of Gol Darreh and Anuch.{
  "type": "FeatureCollection",
  "features": [
    {
      "type": "Feature",
      "properties": {},
      "geometry": {
        "type": "Polygon",
        "coordinates": [
          [
            [
              48.585559,
              34.090348
            ],
            [
              48.586705,
              34.089478
            ],
            [
              48.58718,
              34.088184
            ],
            [
              48.584566,
              34.086164
            ],
            [
              48.584171,
              34.086672
            ],
            [
              48.583864,
              34.087495
            ],
            [
              48.582136,
              34.088284
            ],
            [
              48.582166,
              34.088786
            ],
            [
              48.583575,
              34.089239
            ],
            [
              48.584049,
              34.089729
            ],
            [
              48.585159,
              34.089959
            ],
            [
              48.585559,
              34.090348
            ]
          ]
        ]
      }
    },
    {
      "type": "Feature",
      "properties": {},
      "geometry": {
        "type": "Point",
        "coordinates": [
          48.584864,
          34.088202
        ]
      }
    }
  ]
}

Language 
The people of this land speak the dialect of Northern Lori.

Tourist Attractions 
Its sights include old aqueducts and natural landscapes.

Products 
Agricultural products: Grape, barley, wheat, peas, lentil.

Souvenirs 
Grape juice, Raisin.

Possibilities 
Cultural and religious facilities: It has a primary school, an Abolfazl mosque and a comprehensive mosque.

Welfare Amenities: Gas, water, sanitary piping, electricity, telephone, and network cover are included in the fiber optic path.

References 

Populated places in Malayer County